Allen Temple American Methodist Episcopal Church may refer to:
 Allen Temple AME Church (Cincinnati, Ohio)
 Allen Temple A.M.E. Church (Greenville, South Carolina)